Rhubarb forcers are bell-shaped pots with a lidded opening at the top, used to cover rhubarb to limit photosynthesis. They encourage the plant to grow early in the season and also to produce blanched stems. The pots are placed over two- to three-year-old rhubarb crowns during winter or very early spring. Once shoots appear the lid is taken off, causing them to grow towards the light.

See also 
 Rhubarb Triangle

References

External links 
 Forcing rhubarb in winter
 How to force rhubarb

Gardening tools
Rhubarb